Togo competed at the 2012 Summer Olympics in London, held from July 27 to 12 August 2012. This was the nation's ninth appearance at the Olympics, except the 1976 Summer Olympics in Montreal, and the 1980 Summer Olympics in Moscow because of the African and the United States boycott.

The Togo National Olympic Committee sent the nation's largest delegation to the Games after the 1992 Summer Olympics in Barcelona. A total of six athletes, four men and two women, competed in five different sports, including the nation's debut in swimming and table tennis. Freestyle swimmer Adzo Kpossi, at age 13, became the youngest athlete ever to compete in these Olympic games. Meanwhile, judoka Kouami Sacha Denanyoh, at age 32. was the oldest of the team, and competed at his third Olympics since 2000 (except the 2004 Summer Olympics in Athens, where he was not selected). Slalom kayaker Benjamin Boukpeti was Togo's greatest highlight to these games. He set several distinctions: the inaugural Togolese athlete to win an Olympic medal (a bronze), achieved in Beijing, to compete in his third consecutive Olympic Games, and to reprise his role to bear the national flag for the second time at the opening ceremony.

Togo did not achieve any medals at these Games, although Boukpeti placed last in the men's slalom kayak finals.

Athletics

Men

Women

Canoeing

Slalom
Togo was given a tripartite invitation.

Judo

Togo has had 1 judoka invited.

Swimming 

Women

Table tennis

Togo has been given a wild card.

References

Nations at the 2012 Summer Olympics
2012
2012 in Togolese sport